The West Mountain Historic District is a  historic district northwest of the center of Ridgefield, Connecticut in Fairfield County, Connecticut that was listed on the National Register of Historic Places in 1984.  It includes 12 contributing buildings.  It is roughly centered on the junction of West Mountain Road and Oreneca Road, between Ridgefield center and the state line.  It includes five large country estates developed in the early 20th century.  Its "grandest" house is "Orenica", described as "a 1932 Georgian Revival style stone structure of considerable pretension" that was home of Philip Dakin Wagoner (1876-1972), chairman of the board of the Underwood Typewriter Company.

See also
National Register of Historic Places listings in Fairfield County, Connecticut

References

National Register of Historic Places in Fairfield County, Connecticut
Colonial Revival architecture in Connecticut
Historic districts in Fairfield County, Connecticut
Ridgefield, Connecticut
Historic districts on the National Register of Historic Places in Connecticut